The 28th Golden Horse Awards (Mandarin:第28屆金馬獎) took place on December 4, 1991 at National Theater in Taipei, Taiwan.

References

28th
1991 film awards
1991 in Taiwan